Klasses julkalender (English: Klasse's Christmas calendar) was a Swedish children's television series, broadcast as SVT's Christmas calendar on Sveriges Television from November 29 to December 25, 1992. The series followed Klasse Möllberg who lives in a little hut in the tallest spruce of the Swedish forest and has Christmas fun.

Story

Cast
Lasse Åberg
Pernilla Wiberg
Janne Schaffer
Kalle Moraeus
After Shave
Anders Eriksson
Anders Berglund
Björn Skifs
Ingemar Stenmark
Charlie Norman
Roger Tallroth
Anders Forsslund
Bortalaget
Highway Stars
Kalypso Orkestern

Episodes

References

External links

1992 Swedish television series debuts
Sveriges Television's Christmas calendar
1990s Swedish television series
1992 Swedish television series endings